The Great War is a 2019 American war drama film written and directed by Steven Luke and starring Bates Wilder, Hiram A. Murray, Billy Zane and Ron Perlman.

Cast
Bates Wilder as Captain William Rivers
Aaron Courteau as Sergeant Allistor Richardson
Hiram A. Murray as Private John Cain
Billy Zane as Colonel Jack Morrison
Ron Perlman as General Pershing
Edgar Damatian	as Private Cardinni
Judah McFadden as Private Pinchelli
Andrew Stecker as Corporal Anson Kirby
Cody Fleury as Private O'Malley
Jeremy Michael Pereira as Captain A.J. Stevens

Reception
The film has  rating on Rotten Tomatoes.

References

External links
 
 

2019 films
American war drama films
Saban Films films
2010s war drama films
American World War I films
World War I films based on actual events
2010s English-language films
2010s American films